The 1992 Nigerian Senate election in Sokoto State was held on July 4, 1992, to elect members of the Nigerian Senate to represent Sokoto State. Garba Ila Gada representing Sokoto North, Saidu Idirisu representing Sokoto East and Ladan Shuni representing Sokoto South all won on the platform of the National Republican Convention.

Overview

Summary

Results

Sokoto North 
The election was won by Garba Ila Gada of the National Republican Convention.

Sokoto East 
The election was won by Saidu Idirisu of the National Republican Convention.

Sokoto South 
The election was won by Ladan Shuni of the National Republican Convention.

References 

Sokoto State Senate elections
July 1992 events in Nigeria
Sok